Sure 'Nuff is the debut album by jazz organist Sonny Phillips which was recorded in 1969 and released on the Prestige label.

Reception

Allmusic awarded the album 4 stars stating "Sure 'Nuff isn't an undiscovered masterpiece or anything, but it's considerably more interesting than the average soul-jazz album from the late '60s".

Track listing 
All compositions by Sonny Phillips except as noted
 "Sure 'Nuff, Sure 'Nuff" - 6:50   
 "Be Yourself" - 4:30   
 "Oleo" (Sonny Rollins) - 7:40   
 "Mobile to Chicago" - 7:25   
 "The Other Blues" - 9:10

Personnel 
Sonny Phillips - organ
Virgil Jones - trumpet (tracks 1, 2 & 4)
Houston Person - tenor saxophone
Joe Jones - guitar
Bob Bushnell - electric bass
Bernard Purdie - drums

References 

Sonny Phillips albums
1970 debut albums
Prestige Records albums
Albums recorded at Van Gelder Studio
Albums produced by Bob Porter (record producer)